The Danish Defence Acquisition and Logistics Organization (DALO) is a joint service unit under the Ministry of Defence, tasked with purchase, service and support of equipment within the Danish Defence. It used to be known as the Danish Defence Material Service.

Tasks 
DALO acquires, maintains and phases out equipment for all of the military authorities - from tanks, ships and aircraft to boots and pocket knives.
In collaboration with the Joint Defence Command, FMI ensures support and supplies for the Armed Forces ongoing operations at home and abroad.

Organisation 
In 2006, Army Materiel Command, Navy Materiel Command and Air Materiel Command, were merged to form the joint materiel command (FMT). As part of the Danish Defence Agreement 2013-2017, FMT was reorganized into FMI.

The new FMI (pr. 1 October 2014) is subject to the Ministry of Defence department, and manages nearly DKK 7 billion (approx. US$1 billion) of the total defence budget. Ministry of Defence department and FMI worked together to prepare a performance where, among other FMI's role, mission and vision are described.

Commander

References 

Military of Denmark
2006 establishments in Denmark
Organizations established in 2006
Government agencies of Denmark